Kyle Noke (born 18 March 1980) is an Australian retired mixed martial artist who competed as a Welterweight in the Ultimate Fighting Championship. A professional competitor since 2002, Noke has also fought for EliteXC.

Background
Noke, originally from Dubbo, in New South Wales, competed in various sports growing up including rugby, and began training in mixed martial arts in 2002. Noke also worked in security; guarding "Crocodile Hunter" Steve Irwin, Noke serving as Irwin's bodyguard for three years during Irwin's heyday as host of the Australian-based nature show. Noke's job was eventually changed to train "The Crocodile Hunter" between filming sessions. Noke and another bodyguard worked with Irwin on boxing, Brazilian jiu-jitsu and wrestling. During his time with Irwin, Noke bounced between the U.S. and Australia as he continued to rack up professional victories; he found the tutelage of renowned trainer Greg Jackson. In September 2006 Noke got word that Irwin had died. He went back to security at the zoo where Irwin worked but soon afterward decided that he needed to go after his dream of being a mixed martial artist.

Mixed martial arts career

Early career
Noke made his professional MMA debut in November 2002. Over the next five years, Noke fought in his native Australia and amassed a record of 13–3–1. During this time, he split a pair of matches with fellow future UFC fighter George Sotiropoulos.

EliteXC
Noke made his United States MMA debut in November 2007 as he defeated Seth Kleinbeck via TKO due to cuts at EliteXC: Renegade. Noke returned to the promotion in February 2008, losing via KO to Scott Smith at EliteXC: Street Certified.

The Ultimate Fighter
Noke was a participant on the UFC reality show The Ultimate Fighter: Team Liddell vs. Team Ortiz in 2010. After winning his preliminary fight to enter the house, Kyle was chosen for the first fight against Team Ortiz member Clayton McKinney and won via triangle choke in the first round.

In the quarter-finals, Noke was selected to face rival team member and good friend Kris McCray. Although Noke was highly touted and favored to win, he eventually began to succumb to the multiple takedowns by McCray, which Noke had little answer to gaining position or escaping and lost the fight via unanimous decision after three rounds.

Ultimate Fighting Championship
Noke made his UFC debut against TUF teammate Josh Bryant at The Ultimate Fighter 11 Finale. After putting in a dominant first round, Noke won via second-round TKO.

Noke defeated Rob Kimmons on 13 November 2010 at UFC 122 at 1:33 in the second round via rear naked choke.

Noke faced Chris Camozzi on 27 February 2011 at UFC 127. Noke defeated Camozzi in the first round with a rear-naked choke. Noke was also awarded Submission of the Night bonus.

Noke was expected to face Tom Lawlor on 14 August 2011 at UFC on Versus 5. Lawlor, however, pulled out of the bout due to an injury in early July 2011. Ed Herman replaced Lawlor on the card. After defending multiple submission attempts from Herman, Noke finally tapped to an inverted heelhook 4:15 in the first round. Noke was clearly in pain from the submission, and he needed help to walk out of the octagon.

Noke was expected to face Jared Hamman on 3 March 2012 at UFC on FX 2, but Hamman was forced to withdraw with an injury and replaced by Andrew Craig. After a dominant first round by Noke, Craig took control in the next two rounds and Noke lost the fight via unanimous decision.

Noke made his welterweight debut against Charlie Brenneman on 22 September at UFC 152. Noke defeated Brenneman via TKO only 45 seconds into the first round.

Noke was expected to face Seth Baczynski on 15 December 2012 at UFC on FX 6. However, Noke pulled out of the bout citing a shoulder injury and was replaced by Mike Pierce.

In June 2013, it was announced that Noke would be coaching The Ultimate Fighter Nations: Canada vs. Australia, opposite Patrick Côté. The reality show features welterweights and Middleweights. The coaches faced each other on 16 April 2014 at The Ultimate Fighter Nations Finale. Noke lost the fight via unanimous decision.

Noke was expected to face Yoshihiro Akiyama on 20 September 2014 at UFC Fight Night 52. However, Noke was forced out of the bout with a knee injury.

Noke was expected to face Andreas Ståhl on 10 May 2015 at UFC Fight Night 65. However, on 2 April, it was announced that Ståhl pulled out of the fight due to undisclosed reasons and was replaced by promotional newcomer Jonavin Webb. Noke won the fight via split decision.

Noke faced Peter Sobotta on 15 November 2015 at UFC 193. He won the fight via TKO in the first round after dropping Sobotta with a body kick and following up with punches on the ground. The victory also produced a Performance of the Night award for Noke.

Noke was expected to face Kelvin Gastelum on 2 January 2016 at UFC 195. However 22 December, Gastelum was forced to pull out due to a wrist injury and was replaced by promotional newcomer Alex Morono. Noke lost the bout via split decision.

Noke next faced Keita Nakamura on 13 July 2016 at UFC Fight Night 91. He lost the fight via submission (rear-naked choke) in the final seconds of the second round.

Noke was expected to face Dominique Steele on 27 November 2016 at UFC Fight Night 101. However, Steele pulled out of the fight on 21 October and was replaced by Omari Akhmedov. Noke lost the fight via unanimous decision and subsequently announced his retirement shortly after.

Retirement and comeback
In October 2017, 10 months after his retirement announcement, Noke announced plans for an attempted comeback and step into the cage again. As of March 2019, Noke does not have timetable on a possible return.

Championships and achievements
 Ultimate Fighting Championship
Submission of the Night (One time) vs. Chris Camozzi 
Performance of the Night (One time)
 Xtreme Fighting Championships (Australia)
XFC Middleweight Championship (One time)

Mixed martial arts record

|-
|Loss
|align=center|
|Omari Akhmedov
| Decision (unanimous)
|UFC Fight Night: Whittaker vs. Brunson
|
|align=center|3
|align=center|5:00
|Melbourne, Australia
|  
|-
|Loss
|align=center|22–9–1
|Keita Nakamura
|Submission (rear-naked choke)
|UFC Fight Night: McDonald vs. Lineker
|
|align=center|2
|align=center|4:59
|Sioux Falls, South Dakota, United States
|  
|-
|Loss
|align=center|22–8–1
|Alex Morono
|Decision (split) 
|UFC 195 
|
|align=center|3
|align=center|5:00
|Las Vegas, Nevada, United States
|
|-
|Win
|align=center|22–7–1
|Peter Sobotta
|TKO (body kick and punches)
|UFC 193
|
|align=center|1
|align=center|2:01
|Melbourne, Australia
|
|-
| Win
|align=center| 21–7–1
|Jonavin Webb
| Decision (split)
|UFC Fight Night: Miocic vs. Hunt
| 
|align=center| 3
|align=center| 5:00
|Adelaide, Australia
|
|-
| Loss
|align=center| 20–7–1
| Patrick Côté
| Decision (unanimous)
| The Ultimate Fighter Nations Finale: Bisping vs. Kennedy
| 
|align=center| 3 
|align=center| 5:00 
|Quebec City, Quebec, Canada
|
|-
| Win
|align=center| 20–6–1
| Charlie Brenneman
| TKO (punches)
| UFC 152
| 
|align=center| 1
|align=center| 0:45
|Toronto, Ontario, Canada
|
|-
| Loss
|align=center| 19–6–1
| Andrew Craig
| Decision (unanimous)
| UFC on FX: Alves vs. Kampmann
| 
|align=center| 3
|align=center| 5:00
|Sydney, Australia
|
|-
| Loss
|align=center| 19–5–1
| Ed Herman
| Submission (inverted heel hook)
| UFC Live: Hardy vs. Lytle
| 
|align=center| 1
|align=center| 4:15
|Milwaukee, Wisconsin, United States
|
|-
| Win
|align=center| 19–4–1
| Chris Camozzi
| Submission (rear-naked choke)
| UFC 127
| 
|align=center| 1
|align=center| 1:35
|Sydney, Australia
| 
|-
| Win
|align=center| 18–4–1
| Rob Kimmons
| Submission (rear-naked choke)
| UFC 122
| 
|align=center| 2
|align=center| 1:33
|Oberhausen, Germany
| 
|-
| Win
|align=center| 17–4–1
| Josh Bryant
| TKO (punches)
| The Ultimate Fighter: Team Liddell vs. Team Ortiz Finale
| 
|align=center| 2
|align=center| 3:12
|Las Vegas, Nevada, United States
| 
|-
| Win
|align=center| 16–4–1
| Kyacey Uscola
| Decision (unanimous)
| Top Combat Championship
| 
|align=center| 3
|align=center| 5:00
|Hato Rey, Puerto Rico
| 
|-
| Win
|align=center| 15–4–1
| Yoann Gouaida
| Submission (rear-naked choke)
| Cage Fighting Championships 4
| 
|align=center| 1
|align=center| 1:43
|Sydney, Australia
| 
|-
| Loss
|align=center| 14–4–1
| Scott Smith
| KO (punch)
| EliteXC: Street Certified
| 
|align=center| 2
|align=center| 0:07
|Miami, Florida, United States
| 
|-
| Win
|align=center| 14–3–1
| Seth Kleinbeck
| TKO (doctor stoppage)
| EliteXC: Renegade
| 
|align=center| 2
|align=center| 4:22
|Corpus Christi, Texas, United States
| 
|-
| Draw
|align=center| 13–3–1
| Hector Lombard
| Draw
| Cage Fighting Championship 1
| 
|align=center| 3
|align=center| 5:00
|Gold Coast, Australia
| 
|-
| Win
|align=center| 13–3
| Brian Ebersole
| Decision (majority)
| XFC 12: Oktoberfist
| 
|align=center| 5
|align=center| 5:00
|Sydney, Australia
| Won the XFC Middleweight Championship.
|-
| Win
|align=center| 12–3
| Yusaku Tsukumo
| Submission (triangle choke)
| Warriors Realm 6
| 
|align=center| 1
|align=center| 1:14
|Brisbane, Australia
| 
|-
| Loss
|align=center| 11–3
| George Sotiropoulos
| Decision (unanimous)
| Warriors Realm 5
| 
|align=center| 5
|align=center| 5:00
|Geelong Australia
| 
|-
| Win
|align=center| 11–2
| Byron Donnelly
| Decision (unanimous)
| Warriors Realm 4
| 
|align=center| 2
|align=center| 5:00
|Geelong, Australia
| 
|-
| Win
|align=center| 10–2
| George Sotiropoulos
| Decision (split)
| Warriors Realm 4
| 
|align=center| 2
|align=center| 5:00
|Geelong, Australia
| 
|-
| Win
|align=center| 9–2
| Luke Pezutti
| TKO (punches)
| Warriors Realm 3
| 
|align=center| 1
|align=center| 5:00
|Brisbane, Australia
| 
|-
| Loss
|align=center| 8–2
| Katsuya Inoue
| Decision (split)
| Warriors Realm 2
| 
|align=center| 3
|align=center| 5:00
|Sunshine Coast, Australia
| 
|-
| Win
|align=center| 8–1
| Rhys Whitmore
| Submission (triangle choke)
| Warriors Realm 1
| 
|align=center| 1
|align=center| 0:38
|Sunshine Coast, Australia
| 
|-
| Win
|align=center| 7–1
| Matt Te-Paa
| Decision (split)
| XFC 5: When Worlds Collide
| 
|align=center| 3
|align=center| 5:00
|Southport, Australia
| 
|-
| Win
|align=center| 6–1
| Mike Sethna
| Submission (kneebar)
| Xtreme Fight Club 2
| 
|align=center| 3
|align=center| 1:58
|Richlands, Australia
| 
|-
| Win
|align=center| 5–1
| Jimmy Raborn
| Submission (rear-naked choke)
| XFC 4: Australia vs. The World
| 
|align=center| 2
|align=center| 1:30
|Southport, Australia
|
|-
| Loss
|align=center| 4–1
| Noriyuki Hayakawa
| Submission (armbar)
| Xtreme Fighting Championships 3
| 
|align=center| 3
|align=center| 1:33
|Southport, Australia
|
|-
| Win
|align=center| 4–0
| Neil Swailes
| TKO (punches)
| Xtreme Fighting Championships 2
| 
|align=center| 2
|align=center| 2:24
|Southport, Australia
|
|-
| Win
|align=center| 3–0
| Adrian Bolton
| TKO (punches)
| Xtreme Fighting Championships 1
| 
|align=center| 1
|align=center| 2:34
|Southport, Australia
| 
|-
| Win
|align=center| 2–0
| Ulf Strand
| TKO (punches)
| Spartan Reality Fight 6
| 
|align=center| 2
|align=center| 1:21
|New South Wales, Australia
| 
|-
| Win
|align=center| 1–0
| Peter Robbie
| TKO (submission to punches)
| Spartan Reality Fight 5
| 
|align=center| 1
|align=center| 2:25
|New South Wales, Australia
|

Mixed martial arts exhibition record

See also
 List of current UFC fighters
 List of male mixed martial artists

References

External links
Official UFC Profile

 
 

Living people
Australian male mixed martial artists
Middleweight mixed martial artists
People from Dubbo
1980 births
Australian expatriate sportspeople in the United States
Australian practitioners of Brazilian jiu-jitsu
Welterweight mixed martial artists
Mixed martial artists utilizing boxing
Mixed martial artists utilizing wrestling
Mixed martial artists utilizing Brazilian jiu-jitsu
Bodyguards
Ultimate Fighting Championship male fighters
Sportsmen from New South Wales